Richard Mabuza (born 3 March 1946 – 2018) was a Swazi athlete. He competed at the 1972 Summer Olympics in the men's marathon, where he finished in 17th place.

References

1946 births
2018 deaths
Swazi male long-distance runners
Olympic athletes of Eswatini
Athletes (track and field) at the 1970 British Commonwealth Games
Athletes (track and field) at the 1972 Summer Olympics
Athletes (track and field) at the 1974 British Commonwealth Games
Athletes (track and field) at the 1978 Commonwealth Games
Commonwealth Games bronze medallists for Eswatini
Commonwealth Games medallists in athletics
Swazi male marathon runners
African Games gold medalists for Eswatini
African Games medalists in athletics (track and field)
African Games bronze medalists for Eswatini
Athletes (track and field) at the 1973 All-Africa Games
Athletes (track and field) at the 1978 All-Africa Games
Medallists at the 1974 British Commonwealth Games